"Another Rock and Roll Christmas" is a 1984 Christmas song by English glam rock singer Gary Glitter, written by Glitter with Mike Leander and Eddie (Edward John) Seago and produced by Leander. It was one of the most played and popular Christmas hits on UK radio from the mid-1980s to the mid-1990s, prior to Glitter's 1997 arrest, and 1999 conviction for possession of child pornography. Initially released in 1984, the song was later included on Glitter's fifth studio album, Boys Will Be Boys (1984) and was reissued many times, both as a single (including a collectors picture disc) and on several Christmas compilation albums that were released prior to the singer's conviction for sexual offences.

Charts
The single, which reached No. 7 on the UK Singles Chart, was Glitter's most successful song since 1975. Though he was still touring regularly when the song was released, Glitter credited "Another Rock and Roll Christmas" as a song that gave him a resurgence in popularity. It was his final UK Top 40 hit.

Certifications

Track listing
"Another Rock and Roll Christmas"
"Another Rock and Roll Christmas (Instrumental Remix)"

References

External links
 

British Christmas songs
1984 singles
Gary Glitter songs
Songs written by Mike Leander
Song recordings produced by Mike Leander
Songs written by Gary Glitter
Arista Records singles
1984 songs
Songs written by Eddie Seago